In July 2016, the International Union for Conservation of Nature (IUCN) listed 390 near threatened arthropod species. Of all evaluated arthropod species, 4.1% are listed as near threatened. 
The IUCN also lists six arthropod subspecies as near threatened.

No subpopulations of arthropods have been evaluated by the IUCN.

This is a complete list of near threatened arthropod species and subspecies as evaluated by the IUCN.

Arachnids

Branchiopoda
Mono Lake brine shrimp (Artemia monica)
California linderiella (Linderiella occidentalis)

Entognatha
Blasconura batai
Lepidonella lecongkieti

Maxillopoda

Malacostracans

Decapods
There are 71 decapod species and six decapod subspecies assessed as near threatened.

Parastacids

Gecarcinucids

Atyids
Species

Subspecies

Cambarids

Potamids

Other decapod species

Insects
There are 301 insect species assessed as near threatened.

Hemiptera

Orthoptera

Hymenoptera

Lepidoptera
Lepidoptera comprises moths and butterflies. There are 62 species in the order Lepidoptera assessed as near threatened.

Swallowtail butterflies

Lycaenids

Nymphalids

Other Lepidoptera species

Beetles
There are 56 beetle species assessed as near threatened.

Geotrupids

Click beetles

Scarabaeids

Other beetle species

Odonata
Odonata includes dragonflies and damselflies. There are 119 species in the order Odonata assessed as near threatened.

Chlorocyphids

Platycnemidids

Gomphids

Cordulegastrids

Corduliids

Calopterygids

Coenagrionids

Aeshnids

Libellulids

Other Odonata species

See also 
 Lists of IUCN Red List near threatened species
 List of least concern arthropods
 List of vulnerable arthropods
 List of endangered arthropods
 List of critically endangered arthropods
 List of recently extinct arthropods
 List of data deficient arthropods

References 

Arthropods
Near threatened arthropods
Near threatened arthropods
Arthropod conservation